Horst Heinz Köhler (born 15 February 1963), known under his stage name Guildo Horn, is a German Schlager singer. He is best known for his eccentric stage persona, which includes outrageous clothes and extroverted antics.

At the Eurovision Song Contest 1998, he came seventh with the song "Guildo hat euch lieb!" ("Guildo loves you!").

Discography 
Albums
 Rückkehr nach Mendocino (1992)
 Sternstunden der Zärtlichkeiten (1995)
 Danke! (1997)
 Schön! (1999)
 Der König der Möwen (2002)
 Guildo Horn featuring Pomp & Brass (2003)
 Essential (2005)
 Die Rocky Horny Weihnachtsshow (2005)
 Erhebet die Herzen (2008)
 20 Jahre Zärtlichkeit (2010)
 Weihnachtsfestival der Liebe (MCD) (2012)

References

External links 

 
 Official website

1963 births
Living people
People from Trier
20th-century German male singers
German pop singers
German  male  singer-songwriters
Eurovision Song Contest entrants for Germany
Eurovision Song Contest entrants of 1998
Schlager musicians